Kovacevich is a surname. Notable people with the surname include: 
Christopher Kovacevich (1928–2010), Metropolitan bishop of Libertyville and Chicago in the Serbian Orthodox Church
Richard Kovacevich (born 1943), retired chairman of the board of directors and previous CEO of Wells Fargo & Company
Stephen Kovacevich (born 1940), American classical pianist and conductor

See also
 Kovachevich, surname
 Kovačević, surname
 Kovačevič, surname
 Kovalevich, surname
 Kovach (surname)
 Kovač (surname)

English-language surnames